The Bishops' Conference of Bosnia and Herzegovina is the permanent assembly of Catholic bishops in Bosnia and Herzegovina founded in 1994 by the Holy See.

The president of the Conference is elected among the bishops for a term of five years. Tomo Vukšić, Archbishop of Vrhbosna, is the incumbent president of the Conference.

The Episcopal Conference of Bosnia and Herzegovina is a member of the Council of European Episcopal Conferences (CCEE).

Current membership 
The membership of the BKBIH consists of all active and retired Latin Church Catholic and Eastern Catholic bishops of Bosnia and Herzegovina.

Organizational structure 
The Conference is composed of the Assembly, the Permanent Council and the General Secretariat, as demanded by 1983 Code of Canon Law.

It consists also of councils, committees, offices and organizations that carry out the work and decisions of the Assembly.

Councils 
Council for Dialogue among Religions and Cultures
Council for Clergy
Council for Consecrated Life
Council for Laity
Pedagogical Council for Catholic Schools in Europe
Council for Diocesan Seminaries
Council for Minor Seminaries
Council for Family
Council for Catechesis and New Evangelization
Council for Liturgy
Council for Communications
Council for the Pastoral Care of the Croatian Diaspora (joint council of Episcopal Conferences of Croatia and Bosnia and Herzegovina)
Council for Dialogue among Religions and Cultures
Supervisory Board for Caritas

Committees 
Committee for Doctrine of the Faith
Committee Iustitia et Pax
Committee for Pontifical Croatian College of St. Jerome (joint Committee of Episcopal Conferences of Croatia and Bosnia and Herzegovina)

Offices 
Catechetical Office
Office for Youth 
Supervisory Board for the Common Treasury

Organizations 
Caritas
Catholic News Agency

See also
 Roman Catholic Church in Bosnia and Herzegovina

References

External links
 http://www.gcatholic.org/dioceses/conference/007.htm
 http://www.ktabkbih.net/

Bosnia and Herzegovina
Catholic Church in Bosnia and Herzegovina
Christian organizations established in 1994